The Hamilton-Brown House, in Franklin, Tennessee, also known as the Elijah Hamilton House or as Cottonwood, is a historic two-story brick house that was listed on the National Register of Historic Places in 2006.

It was built between 1792 and c.1800, making it one of the very oldest houses in Williamson County.  It originally had a hall-and-parlor plan.  A brick one-story east wing was extended in c. 1850 and c. 1940.  A one-story brick and log north wing was extended from the east wing in c.1960 and c.1997.

The property is denoted as Williamson County historic resource WM-56.

References

Houses on the National Register of Historic Places in Tennessee
Houses in Franklin, Tennessee
Federal architecture in Tennessee
Hall-parlor plan architecture in Tennessee
Houses completed in 1800
National Register of Historic Places in Williamson County, Tennessee